Manny González (born June 3, 1990) is a Colombian-American soccer player who plays for the Maryland Bobcats FC in the National Independent Soccer Association.

Career
González spent the 2012 season with the Strikers as a practice player. He signed with the club ahead of the 2013 season on January 31, 2013.

González made his professional debut on May 11, 2013 against Minnesota United FC. He started and played the whole match and provided the assist on the game-winning goal in the 2–1 victory.

In January 2020, González joined Oakland Roots SC of the National Independent Soccer Association. Two years later, he joined Maryland Bobcats FC.

References

1990 births
Living people
American soccer players
Florida Gulf Coast Eagles men's soccer players
Palm Beach Pumas players
Austin Aztex U23 players
Floridians FC players
Fort Lauderdale Strikers players
Miami FC players
Mississippi Brilla players
FC Tulsa players
Maryland Bobcats FC players
Oakland Roots SC players
Soccer players from Florida
USL League Two players
North American Soccer League players
USL Championship players
National Independent Soccer Association players
Association football midfielders
Colombian emigrants to the United States
People from Pompano Beach, Florida
La Equidad footballers
Treasure Coast Tritons players
Sportspeople from Broward County, Florida